Sigmund (Zygmunt or Siegmund) Lebert, born Samuel Levi on 12 December 1821 in Ludwigsburg and died on 8 December 1884 in Stuttgart, was a German pianist and music teacher, and one of the founders of the Stuttgart Music School. With Ludwig Stark and others he prepared a large number of works for the use of students there, including the Grosse theoretisch-praktische Klavierschule, a piano method which was translated into several languages and widely distributed in both Europe and America. Together with Franz Liszt and the cooperation of Ignaz Lachner, Vincenz Lachner and Immanuel Faisst, he created arrangements of piano works by Wolfgang Amadeus Mozart, and with Hans von Bulow, the famous Cotta edition of the piano sonatas of Ludwig van Beethoven published in 1881.

References

External links

1821 births
1884 deaths
German Romantic composers
German classical pianists
Male classical pianists
Academic staff of the State University of Music and Performing Arts Stuttgart
19th-century classical composers
German male classical composers
19th-century classical pianists
19th-century German composers
German pianists
German male pianists
19th-century German male musicians